Tirgan (also Romanized as Tīrgān) is a village in Zangelanlu Rural District, Lotfabad District, Dargaz County, Razavi Khorasan Province, Iran. At the 2006 census, its population was 1,398, in 315 families.

References 

Populated places in Dargaz County